Negro Flat was a placer gold mining camp on the Salmon River, now located in  Siskiyou County, California.
It was located originally in Trinity County, in 1850.

History
Negro Flat was one of the largest gold producers in Trinity County in 1850, along with Gullion's Bar, Bestville, and Sawyers Bar.  In 1851, it became part of Klamath County.  In 1874, its site became part of Siskiyou County, when Klamath County was finally abolished and divided between Siskiyou and Humboldt counties.

References

Settlements formerly in Trinity County, California
Settlements formerly in Klamath County, California
Former populated places in Siskiyou County, California
Populated places established in 1850
1850 establishments in California
Ghost towns in California